Royal Tourist (1905–1909) was an American Thoroughbred racehorse who won the American Classic Preakness Stakes in 1908 and who later that year set a World Record time in winning the Winters Handicap at Emeryville Race Track in Oakland, California.

Background
Bred and raced by Harry Payne Whitney, Royal Tourist's sire was the unraced British import, Sandringham, a son of the outstanding runner and nine-time Leading sire in Great Britain & Ireland, St. Simon. His dam was Leisure, who was also the dam of the 1914 Preakness Stakes winner, Holiday. Leisure's sire was Meddler, the leading sire in North America in 1904 and 1906.

Racing career
Racing at age two under trainer John Rogers, on September 10, 1907 Royal Tourist earned his first win in the Autumn Stakes at Sheepshead Bay Race Track with a stakes record time of 1:11 flat for six furlongs. He went on that year to win the Oakdale Handicap at Aqueduct Racetrack. As a three-year-old in 1908, Royal Tourist's race conditioning was handled by Jack Joyner who took over as trainer of the Whitney racing stable on the death of John Rogers in February. In the pre U.S. Triple Crown era, Royal Tourist was not entered in the Kentucky Derby but on June 2, 1908, under jockey Eddie Dugan, he won what is now the second leg of the Triple Crown series, the Preakness Stakes, contested at the time at a distance of 11/16 miles  at Gravesend Race Track.

Harry Whitney sold Royal Tourist in the early fall of 1908 to Chicagoan Charles R. Ellison. The owner of a number of successful horses, Ellison had won the 1903 Kentucky Derby with Judge Himes and finished second in 1906 with the very good filly, Lady Navarre. Ellison  sent Royal Tourist to race in California where in November he set a new World Record of 1:44 1/5 for 11/16 miles on dirt in the Winters Handicap at Emeryville Race Track in Oakland, California. The colt wintered in California and continued to race there in 1909.

Royal Tourist died of a fever while still in training at the Hamilton (Ont.) racetrack stables on September 27, 1909.

Pedigree

References

1905 racehorse births
1909 racehorse deaths
Racehorses bred in Kentucky
Racehorses trained in the United States
Horse racing track record setters
Preakness Stakes winners
Whitney racehorses
Thoroughbred family A5